The XXVI Army Corps was a Wehrmacht army corps during World War II. It existed from 1939 to 1945. It was also known as Corps Wodrig during the Invasion of Poland.

History 
The XXVI Army Corps was formed under the name Führungsstab z. b. V. under the supervision of AOK 1 in Königsberg on 22 August 1939. Its initial commander was Albert Wodrig, earning it the nickname Korps Wodrig before the official designation as an army corps on 1 October. Wodrig remained in command until 1 October 1942.

During the Invasion of Poland, Corps Wodrig oversaw the 1st and 12th Infantry Divisions, as well as the 1st Cavalry Brigade. Corps Wodrig was stationed in southern East Prussia as part of 3rd Army, commanded by Georg von Küchler. The 3rd Army was in turn under the supervision of Army Group North, commanded by Fedor von Bock. In the opening days of the invasion, Corps Wodrig struck straight south into the units of the Polish Modlin Army in the Mława area. The resulting Battle of Mława ended in German victory. Corps Wodrig advanced further towards Warsaw, assisting the German pincer movement against the Polish capital.

On 1 October 1939, Corps Wodrig was officially redesignated XXVI. Armeekorps, formally upgrading it from a z. b. V. special deployment staff to a full army corps in its own right. In December 1939, XXVI Army Corps was attached to the 6th Army and redeployed to the Lower Rhine area.

In early 1940, the army corps was reshuffled and moved through several armies in quick succession, including the 4th Army, 18th Army and 2nd Army. Under 18th Army, XXVI Army Corps participated on the northern flank of the German invasion force during the Battle of France. The corps fought in the Netherlands and in Flanders. Its initial makeup on 10 May 1940 were the 207th, 254th and 256th Infantry Divisions, as well as the 4th SS Panzergrenadier Regiment. After a brief stay in the Reims area after the German victory over France, the corps was transferred back to its home region, East Prussia. There, its subordinate units remained consistent from 21 July 1940 to 12 March 1941 and were made up by the 161st, 217th and 291st Infantry Divisions.

For Operation Barbarossa, XXVI Army Corps operated under Army Group North and supervised the 61st, 217th and 291st Infantry Divisions. It advanced through the Baltic region into the Leningrad area. It remained in the vicinity of Leningrad throughout the entire duration of the Siege of Leningrad, which was broken by the Red Army on 27 January 1944. Corps commanders switched frequently after Albert Wodrig left his post on 1 October 1942; subsequent corps commanders included Ernst von Leyser, Gustav Fehn, Ernst von Leyser, Carl Hilpert, Martin Grase, Anton Grasser, Gerhard Matzky, Kurt Chill and Gerhard Matzky.

Between July and August 1943, the XXVI Army Corps was the defending unit of the primary urban target of the Soviet Mga offensive. Ultimately, the Soviet attack was repelled.

On 3 March 1944, the XXVI Army Corps joined the newly formed Armeeabteilung Narwa, the army-level promotion of the former LIV Army Corps that was designed to defend the Narva region.

On 15 July 1944, XXVI Army Corps joined the 3rd Panzer Army, making it part of Army Group Centre at the time of Operation Bagration, the Soviet offensive that started on 23 June 1944 and that brought about the total collapse of Army Group Centre. The XXVI Army Corps was pushed back by the Red Army along with the rest of the German armed forces. At the time of German surrender on 8 May 1945, the remnants of XXVI Army Corps which had been fighting in the corps' home in East Prussia were no longer able to mount an organized resistance against the Red Army.

Organizational chart

Commanders 

 General der Artillerie Albert Wodrig (22 August 1939 - 1 October 1942)
 General der Infanterie Ernst von Leyser (1 October 1942 - 1 July 1943)
 General der Panzertruppen Gustav Fehn (1 July - 19 August 1943)
 General der Infanterie Ernst von Leyser (19 August - 31 October 1943)
 General der Infanterie Carl Hilpert (31 October 1943 - 1 January 1944)
 General der Infanterie Martin Grase (1 January - 15 February 1944)
 General der Infanterie Anton Grasser (15 February - 11 May 1944)
 General der Artillerie Wilhelm Berlin (11 May - 15 June 1944)
 General der Infanterie Anton Grasser (15 June - 6 July 1944)
 General der Infanterie Gerhard Matzky (6 July 1944 - May 1945)

References 

Corps of Germany in World War II
Military units and formations established in 1939
Military units and formations disestablished in 1945